The Pacific American Volunteer Association World Environmental Foundation, or PAVA World, is a non-profit volunteer organization dedicated to preserving the environment and promoting relationships within communities. PAVA World specializes in two areas of volunteer work, environmental education, environmental cleanup and restoration work, and in multicultural performance featuring Korean and African drumming and dance. PAVA World is also involved in education, assisting the elderly, and community service. PAVA World is in charge of park restoration and conservation in Griffith Park's Bird Sanctuary. PAVA typically turns out 5,000 volunteers at its Los Angeles River Clean Up and Restoration volunteer events. PAVA has produced Du Doong, a Korean, African, and multicultural drum and dance festival, at the Dolby Theatre in Hollywood, twice. Also, PAVA salmunori team, which includes 7 ethnic instruments, traditional dancers, and traditional flag bearers, has participated in the Hollywood Christmas Parade since 2011. The organization is hoping to perform at the Kodak Theatre, again, in the near future. PAVA works with Heal the Bay on environmental projects. PAVA World works with the NAACP on multicultural shows.

External links

Organizations based in California